MV Sun Express is a German-owned container ship registered under the flag of convenience of Antigua and Barbuda. A U.S. Marine Force Reconnaissance team boarded the ship off the coast of Somalia on 9 September 2010, reclaiming control from pirates who had seized the ship and taken the crew hostage. At the time it was captured by pirates the ship was traveling from Bilbao, Spain, to Singapore with a cargo of anchor chains.

The raid 
It was the first time U.S. military forces off Somalia had staged an action to board a commercial vessel in which pirates were on board with hostages, said a U.S. Navy spokesman.

Grounding
On 3 November 2012, Conmar Cape ran aground off Subic Bay whilst on a voyage from Manila, Philippines to Hong Kong.  She was refloated between 16 and 18 November.

References

External links

2002 ships
Ships built in Hamburg
Maritime incidents in 2010
Maritime incidents in 2012